Imaclava unimaculata, common name the brown-spot turrid, is a species of sea snail, a marine gastropod mollusk in the family Drilliidae.

Description
The size of an adult shell varies between 25 mm and 47 mm. The shell lacks a sutural band or spiral striae. The knobs on the periphery are rather short, instead of terminating ribs as in Clathrodrillia gibbosa (Born, 1778). The shell is yellowish brown, spotted with chestnut and with one large spot on the back of the body whorl.

Distribution
This species occurs in the demersal zone of the Pacific Ocean from Sonora, Mexico to Colombia.

References

  Tucker, J.K. 2004 Catalog of recent and fossil turrids (Mollusca: Gastropoda). Zootaxa 682:1–1295

External links
 

unimaculata
Gastropods described in 1834